General elections were held in Zanzibar in July 1963. The number of seats was increased from 22 to 31, and the result was a victory for the Zanzibar Nationalist Party and Zanzibar and Pemba People's Party alliance, which won 18 seats, despite the fact that the Afro-Shirazi Party, which had won 13, claimed 54.2% of the vote. Voter turnout was estimated to be 99.1%.

The ZNP-ZPPP alliance, which involved the two parties not running candidates against each other in their strongholds, was invited to form a government, and led the country to independence on 10 December that year. However, on 12 January 1964, the Zanzibar Revolution brought the ASP to power.

Results

References

Zanzibar
Elections in Tanzania
1963 in Zanzibar
Politics of Zanzibar
July 1963 events in Africa